Pak Nam Samut Prakan is a town (Thesaban Mueang) in the Mueang Samut Prakan District (Amphoe) of Samut Prakan Province in the Bangkok Metropolitan Region of Central Thailand. In 2017, it had a total population of 31,887 people.

References

Populated places in Samut Prakan province